Lonnie Pryor (born February 2, 1990) is an American football fullback who is a free agent. He was signed as an undrafted free agent by the Jacksonville Jaguars in 2013. He played college football at Florida State.

Professional career

Jacksonville Jaguars
After not being drafted in the 2013 NFL Draft, Pryor signed with the Jacksonville Jaguars as an undrafted free agent. He was released on September 1, 2013 and signed to the team's practice squad on September 2.

Tampa Bay Buccaneers
The Tampa Bay Buccaneers signed Pryor off the Jaguars practice squad on November 19, 2013. The Buccaneers released Pryor on August 29, 2014.

References

External links
 Florida State Seminoles Bio

1990 births
Living people
Players of American football from Florida
American football fullbacks
Florida State Seminoles football players
Jacksonville Jaguars players
Tampa Bay Buccaneers players
People from Okeechobee, Florida
Okeechobee High School alumni